Shaba may refer to:

Places
 Shaba, Kenya
 Shaba National Reserve, a protected area in northern Kenya
 Shaba Province, name of Katanga Province in present Democratic Republic of Congo between 1971 and 1997
 Shabo, Odessa Oblast, town in Odessa Oblast, Ukraine
 Shaba Plateau, a farming and ranching region in the Democratic Republic of the Congo, located in the southeastern Katanga Province
 Shaba, Yongshun (砂坝镇), a town in Yongshun County, Hunan

Conflicts
 Shaba Invasions, two armed conflicts in Shaba Province, Zaire
 Shaba I, 1977
 Shaba II, 1978

People
 Abbie Shaba (born 1958), Malawian politician
 Clement Shaba (1926–2008), Zambian Anglican bishop
 McJones Shaba, Malawian politician

Other uses
 Cigaritis shaba, a butterfly of family Lycaenidae
 Iolaus shaba, a butterfly of family Lycaenidae
 Shaba Games, a video game developer based in San Francisco from 1997 to 2009
 Shaba Number, a national standard defined in the framework of the global IBAN

See also
Saba (disambiguation)
 Shabas (disambiguation)
 Shabba (disambiguation)
 Shebaa (disambiguation), variant spelling